Leontyna Halpertowa, née Eleonora Żuczkowska (Puławy, 14 April 1803 – 19 March 1895, Warsaw), was a Polish stage actress and translator. She was one of the most famous Polish actors of her time.

Life 
Leontyna Halpertowa debuted on the Warsaw stage in 1821.  With Bonawentura Kudlicz she toured Płock, Poznań, and Kalisz. In 1824–51 she was active in Warsaw theaters and taught at the Warsaw Drama School. She was one of the most famous Polish actors of the day, and was described as talented and beautiful; she was considered an artist of immense talent and gained the most outstanding reputation in Poland. She played both comic and tragic roles, and was admired for her recitation. She was regarded an ideal of beauty.

She introduced a reform of Polish theatrical diction in the direction of simplicity.

She is also known for translating to the Polish theater plays from the French language.

Roles 
 Sabina in Pierre Corneille's The Horatii;
 Cecilia in Józef Korzeniowski's Miss Married;
 Mirandolina:  the title role in Carlo Goldoni's play Mirandolina;
 Rita in "Rita Hiszapance" Desnoyersa, and Cabot Boule de Bouin;
 Elvira in the comedy "Husband and Wife" Aleksander Fredro;
 Wiardy in the comedy "valuables" Wolf:
 Tragedy of Phaedra in Racine;
 Chimene in "Cid" by Corneille;
 Joanna in "virgin d'Orléans" by Friedrich Schiller;
 Hermione in the tragedy "Andromache" Racine;
 Barbara Radziwill in the tragedy Felińskiego.

See also 
 List of Poles

References 
 Wielka Encyklopedia Powszechna PWN, 1962–1969

19th-century Polish actresses
Polish stage actresses
1803 births
1895 deaths
French–Polish translators
19th-century translators
19th-century Polish women writers
19th-century Polish writers